Sebastián Felipe Zúñiga Fuenzalida (born June 21, 1990) is a Chilean footballer currently playing for Primera B de Chile club Rangers.

Honours

Club
Universidad de Chile
Primera División de Chile (1): 2014 Apertura

Cobresal
Primera División (1): 2015 Clausura

External links
 BDFA Profile at
 
 San Luis official website Profile at

1990 births
Living people
Chilean footballers
Cobreloa footballers
Unión San Felipe footballers
Cobresal footballers
San Luis de Quillota footballers
Curicó Unido footballers
Universidad de Chile footballers
Unión La Calera footballers
Chilean Primera División players
Footballers from Santiago
Association football midfielders